Polly Harding (also known as PJ Harding) is a radio broadcaster from New Zealand.

Biography 
Harding attended the New Zealand Broadcasting School at Christchurch Polytechnic Institute of Technology (now Ara Institute of Canterbury) in 2009. She began working for radio station ZM in Auckland after graduation, and became a co-host with Matt Ward. In 2015 Harding became co-host of the station's drive show with Jason Hawkins.

In 2018 Harding and Hawkins moved to Melbourne, Australia to co-host the KIIS 101.1 FM breakfast show, Jase & PJ. In March 2021, she announced that she was leaving the show to return home to New Zealand.

Recognition 
In 2016, Harding's and Hawkins' show was a finalist in the Best Music Non-Breakfast Host or Team category at the New Zealand Radio Awards.

Finishing Radio 
In June of 2021, Harding left the Jase and PJ show to return home to New Zealand.

References

Living people
New Zealand radio presenters
New Zealand women radio presenters
Australian radio presenters
Australian women radio presenters
1990 births